Safia Bengueddoudj (born 31 January 1986) is a former footballer who played as a midfielder. Born in France, she made three appearances for the Algeria women's national team.

Club career
Bengueddoudj has played for RC Saint-Étienne, AS Saint-Étienne, Le Puy Foot 43 Auvergne and Saint-Étienne FC in France.

International career
Bengueddoudj capped for Algeria at senior level during the 2010 African Women's Championship.

References

External links

1986 births
Living people
Algerian women's footballers
Women's association football midfielders
Algeria women's international footballers
People from Saint-Priest-en-Jarez
Sportspeople from Loire (department)
French women's footballers
AS Saint-Étienne (women) players
Le Puy Foot 43 Auvergne players
Division 1 Féminine players
French sportspeople of Algerian descent
Footballers from Auvergne-Rhône-Alpes